This Is Martin Bonner is a 2013 American drama film written and directed by Chad Hartigan. The film stars Paul Eenhoorn as Martin Bonner, a man in his late 50s forced to relocate to Reno, Nevada, for a new job and his attempts to acclimate and make new friends. Through his work at a non-profit organization, he meets Travis Holloway (Richmond Arquette), and the two men form an unlikely friendship.  It premiered at the Sundance Film Festival in January 2013, where it won the Audience Award for Best of NEXT.

Plot
Martin Bonner has just moved to Nevada from Maryland, leaving behind his two adult children and a life he spent more than two decades building. He is there working at a new job as the volunteer coordinator for a non-profit organization that helps prisoners make the transition from incarceration to freedom. It is Martin’s first job in two years and he has recently declared bankruptcy.

At the same time, Travis Holloway, a prisoner in the program, is being released after serving twelve years. Sent back into the world with nothing, Travis also finds life in Reno difficult to adjust to, despite the help from his program sponsor, Steve Helms.

The stories of Martin and Travis slowly converge, as the two men meet and find that they have much in common, not the least of which is an unspoken need for encouragement and support. Their unlikely friendship blossoms but is put to the test when Travis betrays Martin's trust in order to reunite with his estranged daughter.

Cast

Production
This Is Martin Bonner was shot on location in Reno and Sparks, Nevada, using the Red One camera. Shooting took sixteen days during November 2011.

Release
This Is Martin Bonner premiered at the 2013 Sundance Film Festival, where it won the Audience Award for Best of NEXT. Throughout the year, it screened at the Oxford Film Festival, the Florida Film Festival, the Nashville Film Festival, the Maryland Film Festival, the Wisconsin Film Festival, and the River Run Film Festival. At the Sarasota Film Festival, it won the On Golden Pond Award for Artistic Accomplishment.

It was given a limited theatrical release in North America on June 21, 2013.

Reception
On Rotten Tomatoes the film has an approval rating of 93% based on reviews from 30 critics, with an average rating of 7.85/10. The site's consensus reads: "Solemn but heartfelt, This Is Martin Bonner is a slow-burning drama with an outstanding performance by Paul Eenhoorn as the title character." On Metacritic it has a score of 71 out of 100 based on reviews from 10 critics, indicating "generally favorable reviews".

John Anderson of Variety described it as "A mood piece, a character study and an exercise in poetic gesture possessed of a sort of evanescent, secular spirituality. Helmer Chad Hartigan's second feature is Americana of a very immediate sort, a tale of redemption that may leave its viewers with an uncanny sense of peace." David Rooney of The Hollywood Reporter wrote, "Acted with smart restraint and shot with corresponding composure, this is a somber drama built out of small but acutely observed moments of naturalistic behavior." The New York Times reviewer Nicolas Rapold commented, "It's gratifying to see the care taken with his characters, though it would be no betrayal of them for Mr. Hartigan to flesh out their world and their lives further."

Accolades 

This Is Martin Bonner won the 2013 Sundance Best of Next audience award and the 2014 Independent Spirit John Cassavetes Award.

References

External links 
 
 
 
 

2013 films
2013 drama films
2013 independent films
2010s buddy drama films
American buddy drama films
American drama films
Films scored by Keegan DeWitt
Films set in Reno, Nevada
Sundance Film Festival award winners
2010s English-language films
2010s American films
John Cassavetes Award winners